CMA CGM Vasco de Gama is an Explorer class containership built for CMA CGM. It is named after Portuguese explorer Vasco de Gama.

CMA CGM had originally planned to name the ship after Benjamin Franklin.

The ship was delivered in July 2015, it is among the world's largest containerships, at 17,859 TEU.

References

External links

Vasco de Gama
Vasco de Gama
2015 ships